Padshahnama or Badshah Nama (Chronicle of the Emperor Shah Jahan) is a group of works written as the official history of the reign of the Mughal Emperor Shah Jahan.  Unillustrated texts are known as Shahjahannama, with Padshahnama used for the illustrated manuscript versions.  These works are among the major sources of information about Shah Jahan's reign. Lavishly illustrated copies were produced in the imperial workshops, with many Mughal miniatures. Although military campaigns are given the most prominence, the illustrations and paintings in the manuscripts of these works illuminate life in the imperial court, depicting weddings and other activities.  

The most significant work of this genre was written by Abdul Hamid Lahori, the pupil of Akbar's biographer Abdul Fazal, in two volumes. He could not write the third volume of this genre because of the infirmities of old age.

History

Shah Jahan in his eighth regnal year asked Muhammad Amin Qazvini to write an official history of his reign and he completed his Badshahnama in 1636, which covers the first ten (lunar) years of Shah Jahan’s reign.

Jalaluddin Tabatabai wrote another Badshahnama, but the extant portion of the text covers only four years, from fifth to eighth regnal year of the emperor. The project was later given to Abdul Hamid Lahori, who wrote his Badshahnama in two volumes. The first volume of this work is based upon Qazvini’s work but has more details. The second volume covers the next ten (lunar) years of Shah Jahan’s reign. He completed his work in 1648. Lahori died in 1654. Muhammad Waris, a pupil of Lahori was given the responsibility to complete the task and his Badshahnama (completed in 1656) covers the rest of the period of Shah Jahan’s reign. His work was published by the Asiatic Society as the third volume of the Badshahnama of Lahori.

Extant manuscripts
In 1799, the Nawab (provincial governor) of Oudh in northern India sent the Badshahnama, to King George III of Great Britain. Today, the imperial illustrated manuscript of the Badshahnama of Lahori is preserved in the Royal Library at Windsor Castle, and is known as the Windsor Padshahnama.  It was produced between 1630 and 1657 and contains 44 miniatures, some full page narrative scenes of battles, court ceremonies and other events (11 are across two pages), and some smaller individual portraits, surrounded by geometric decoration. These illustrate the genealogy of the Mughal dynasty which begins the work.  The page size is 58.6 x 36.8 cm, and 13 different lead artists worked on the volume.  In 1994, while the volume was being rebound for conservation reasons, the opportunity was taken to tour all the miniatures in an exhibition that was shown in New Delhi, the Queen's Gallery in London, and six American cities.

Manuscripts of the Badshahnamas of Qazvini and Waris are preserved in the British Library.  A manuscript of the Badshahnama is also with the Khuda Bakhsh Oriental Library, Patna, India.

Other individual miniatures are held in a number of collections. The Khalili Collection of Islamic Art has one miniature in which Shah Jahan and his court watch two elephants fighting. There were some later illustrated manuscript copies made; for example the Metropolitan Museum of Art in New York has miniatures from 17th-century versions, and the Los Angeles County Museum of Art from one of around 1800.

Context
The Padshahnama fits into a tradition of imperial autobiographies or official court biographies, seen in various parts of the world. In South Asia these go back to the Ashokavadana and Harshacharita from ancient India, and the medieval Prithviraj Raso.  The Mughals' ancestor Timur had been celebrated in a number of works, mostly called Zafarnama ("Book of Victories"), such as those by Shami and Yazdi. The latter is the best known, and was also produced in an illustrated copy in the 1590s by Akbar's workshop.  The tradition was continued by the Mughals with the Baburnama (autobiography, not illustrated before Akbar), Akbarnama (biography), and Tuzk-e-Jahangiri or Jahangir-nameh (memoirs of Jahangir).

Gallery

Texts online

Bádsháh-Náma of 'Abdu-L Hamíd Láhorí Packard Humanities Institute

 Sháh Jahán-Náma of 'Ináyat Khán

References

Further reading
 Beach, Milo C. and Ebba Koch, The King of the World: The Badshahnama: An Imperial Mughal Manuscript from the Royal Library, Windsor Castle, Thames & Hudson. 1997. .
 (see index: p. 148-152; plate 25)

External links
 Illustrations from the Badshahnama at Royal Collection; more images
 King of the World - The Badshahnama at University of Pennsylvania
Mughal royal books
Books about the Mughal Empire
Indian literature
17th-century Indian books
17th-century history books
History books about the 17th century
Islamic illuminated manuscripts
Mughal art
Indian manuscripts
17th-century illuminated manuscripts
Indian chronicles